The  Celtic Club is Australia's oldest surviving Irish Club.  It is non-political and secular, catering for those of Irish and Irish/Australian heritage and anyone else with an interest in Irish culture, the Irish contribution to Australia and the wider Celtic family.  The Club is also aware of its Australian heritage and acknowledges that it stands on the traditional land of the Wurundjeri people of the Kulin Nation.

Overview 

Founded on 26 September 1887, the club was originally a semi-political association, supportive of Irish Home Rule among Melbourne's sizeable Irish population; and championing the rights of Irish Australians in an establishment otherwise dominated by the Anglo-Saxon, (largely Protestant) traditions of Great Britain and its colonies. Reflecting this political background, the original name of the club was the 'Celtic Home Rule Club'.

Though politicised, the club nevertheless sought to avoid domination by the clergy, both to avoid offending Protestant Irish members and to preserve the institution as a contributor to the secular life and culture of Melbourne.

The club had its formal opening in 1888. The founding President was Dr M.U. O'Sullivan KSG; a leading obstetrician of the day, at his funeral Dr O'Sullivan was praised by Bishop Phelan for his opposition to abortion. 

Meetings of the club were originally held at the Imperial Hotel, before the first club rooms were opened at 82 Collins Street. This makes the club the second-oldest Irish organisation in Australia, after the Sydney-based Hibernian Society (founded 1880); and the popularity of such an association is evident from the membership increasing from only 70 to 400 within its first year. The dominant figure of the club from its foundation to the early 20th century, was Morgan Jaguers, who also headed Melbourne's Irish Land League, Irish National League, United Irish League and Melbourne Irish Pipers' Club. A mason and enthusiast for Celtic art forms (then becoming popular in Ireland), Jaguers is also famous for the introduction of the traditional Celtic Cross to the Irish-Catholic areas of Melbourne's cemeteries: a monumental feature which largely dominated from the 1890s to the present day.

Disagreements within the club over political crises back in Ireland almost destroyed it as a viable entity. The Parnell divorce scandal (1890–1891) caused a split in the club between continued supporters of Parnell and his detractors.  Such was the turmoil wrought by the Parnell case, the club was refounded at the corner of Collins and Swanston Streets, in 1891.

Enduring such divisions (and threatened bankruptcy in 1900), the club remained the Australian centre for fundraising aimed at establishing a free Ireland, and a peak was reached in 1912 with the profitable departure dinner of Irish envoys W. A. Redmond and J. T. Donovan. The pair, feted by notaries from all over the country, left Australia after eighteen months with £30,000 to devote to the cause.

Despite being a focal point for often overt sectarianism, the "Triumphant Years" of the club (and its associated St. Patrick's Day events) were between 1908–1913, during which attendances at marches rose to 100,000, and successive Governors-General also put in appearances at the club and festivities, before World War I brought renewed tensions.

With civil war threatening in Ireland in 1914, Club president Major T. M. McInerney took the remarkable step of cabling British Prime Minister H. H. Asquith with an offer of assistance from the club. The actual outbreak of war led to the club slowly losing touch with mainstream events, its chief members clinging to outmoded ideas about an autonomous Ireland within the United Kingdom, long after the rank and file had turned to republicanism. The Easter Rising (1916) and Anglo-Irish War (1919–1921) reignited the divide between British loyalism and Irish nationalist feeling in Melbourne, resulting in the increased politicisation of St Patrick's Day marches and events with which the club was associated. Archbishop Daniel Mannix's championing of the 'No Conscription' case caused tension within the Celtic Club; but the Irish Civil War (1922-1923) was most divisive, as politicised Irish Melburnians were forced to choose between the government of the new Irish Free State and the Irish Republican Army (headed by Éamon de Valera). The club practically split again in 1920 as a result of this, as well as the city council's attempts to ban the St. Patrick's Day celebrations.

Irish politics quickly became less important, particularly as the effects of bitter division and infighting on Melbourne's Irish community became apparent. The Celtic Club was one of the few survivors from the plethora of Irish-Australian political and social organisations that existed before the turmoil of the First World War. As the 20th century progressed, the club began to assume its current form as a purely social gathering place for "respectable gentlemen". The club is now open to all, though women were not accepted as members until 1985.

Headquarters 

From 21 December 1959 to September 2017, the Club's headquarters were at 316–320 Queen Street, near the corner of Latrobe Street in Melbourne's Central Business District. This purchase – of Monahan's New Union Club Hotel – provided the club for the first time with a stable headquarters. The Club was then open to both members and non-members for meals, drinks and other facilities.

The Celtic Club Melbourne current home is at The Metropolitan in North Melbourne. A cosy, friendly and Celtic themed Gastro Pub re-inventing old fashioned customer service and craft beers. Every Friday, some of the Celtic Club Members get together to play live Irish Trad Music that will get your feet tapping.

Histories of the club include Hugh Buggy, The Celtic Club – A Brief History, 1947 and D. J. O'Hearn, Erin go bragh – advance Australia fair: a hundred years of growing, Melbourne: Celtic Club, 1990. Both record the key events in the club's history, and the role it played in helping Irish Melburnians to become accepted into mainstream Australian culture. Histories of the Irish element in Victoria (and Australia more generally) make frequent reference to the importance of the club in maintaining a sense of 'Irishness' in Melbourne, as well as in helping to foster a new identity. The club was also included in Andrew Brown-May and Shurlee Swain's Encyclopedia of Melbourne in 2005.

Current Committee Members  
President: Brian Shanahan

Vice-President: Helene McNamara

Treasurer: Patrick McGorry

Secretary: Conrad Corry

Committee Members: Clare Murphy, Peter Hudson, Ciaran Crehan, Brad Green, Eileen Dunn

Cultural heritage and Irish language 

The Cultural Heritage Committee (CHC) represents a broad cross-section of the cultural groups associated with the Celtic Club. It was established in 2001 to support, present and celebrate not only our Irish and Celtic culture and traditions across the broad spectrum of all Gaelic groups but also to recognize and celebrate the great and continuing Australian Irish contribution to the heritage and culture of our country since early settlement.
Whilst the traditional Irish “craic” continues, a greater variety of cultural heritage programs and performance are now presented which include: language, music, literature, art, drama and theatrical performances, cultural tours, reading circle and film groups, history and genealogy groups, sports and our Irish radio program.
The CHC manages and services the Cultural Resource Centre which comprises the Library, Sound and Film Centre and Senior's Computer Learning Centre which were established in 2004. The Library and the Sound and Film Centre are an important resource for active groups within the Club as well as for general members. The library has a comprehensive collection of over 3,000 books covering all aspects of our Irish and Australian Irish heritage, literature and history. The Computer Kiosk offers a free training introductory program to computers for seniors which is an initiative funded by the Federal Government.
These services are not available during our transition to a new venue as the facilities are in storage. Nevertheless, we are still accepting donations for the Library and the Sound and Film Centre.
THE CULTURAL HERITAGE COMMITTEE IS RESPONSIBLE FOR:
The Cultural Resource Centre, Cultural Events, Regular Radio Programs on the Irish Hour- 3ZZZ- 92.3FM, Student Irish History & Literature Award, Club Artefacts and Paintings, and assisting Victorian Irish Associations & Clubs in Bendigo, Geelong, Vic-South West, Sunraysia & in Melbourne. Further material is on the Club website www.celticclub.com.au 

The Club appreciates the role of the Irish language as an element of Irish-Australian culture. It has hosted a number of events relevant to the language and also provides accommodation for the Irish Language Association of Australia. Irish and Scots language classes are still held in the 'administration centre' at 420-424 William Street West Melbourne. The Irish language group meet on Tuesday nights and the Scottish Gaelic group meet on Wednesday nights.

Members 

Famous members of the Celtic Club include Victorian Premier Charles Gavan Duffy; Labor leader Arthur Augustus Calwell; Justice Redmond Barry former North Melbourne Football Club chairman and media personality Ron Casey and Paddy Donnelly, CFMEU organiser and hero of the WestGate Bridge disaster.

Election of the first woman President and recent developments

The first woman to be elected as President of the Celtic Club was Veronica O'Sullivan in 2014. (The first woman to be elected secretary occurred in 1992 with the election of Patricia McWalters who served for four years). With her election and the installation of a new Executive, it was decided to let attempts to sell the building lapse. The Committee then moved to seek to borrow more money for rebuilding the Club which saw membership slightly rebound and slightly reduced operating losses.  With Ms. O'Sullivan's resignation as President in 2015, the incoming President Brian Shanahan resumed the drive to use the planning permit to either redevelop or sell the building.
The process of the club gaining approval for a planning permit to redevelop the building at 320-326 Queen street commenced with a motion carried at the AGM in 2007.
This laborious process cost the Club slightly more than $600,000 and took many years of special information meetings with members (usually 2 or 3 a year) during which time the club made small losses most years which added to the debt the club had with the bank, which eventually reached more than $2.3 million (2016-17 annual report page 6).
The club members eventually passed a motion at a Special Meeting of members on 21 September 2016 with more than 80% support to sell the building. Five dissident members sued the club to try to stop the sale in the Magistrates Court and the Supreme Court.  They were unsuccessful but this cost the club a lot of money to defend. The sale occurred in 2017.
The Club set up a temporary administrative centre at 420-424 William Street West Melbourne to house administrative staff, the cultural heritage room, kindred organisations of the club and hold some cultural events.
Then in 2018, the club took over the temporary lease of the Metropolitan Hotel in Courtney Street North Melbourne.
The club took up an option to buy back into the redeveloped building at Queen street, but the Club found that the builder did not live up to the expectations of the club, so in 2020 the Committee asked for the deposit to be returned which occurred.
The club is looking for a permanent new home and has about $18 million invested.

Recent 2019 election  

In the most recent Club election, Brian Shanahan and most of his committee were re-elected.

Here are the 2019 Election Results:

President: Brian Shanahan OAM

Vice-President: Helene McNamara

Treasurer: Denis Swift

Secretary: Conrad Corry

Committee Members: Clare Murphy, Peter Hudson, Ciaran Crehan, Brad Green, Eileen Dunn

References 

Celtic Club Rules (2014)
Annual Report of the Celtic Club (2014)
Information Meeting 21.7.2019
Annual Report of the Celtic Club (2015)
Annual Report of the Celtic Club (2019)
Annual Report of the Celtic Club (2018)
President's Letter 13.3.2020

Sources
 Bishop, P. (1999) The Irish Empire: the Story of the Irish Abroad, Boxtree: London. ISBN
 O'Farrell, P. (1987) The Irish in Australia, New South Wales University Press: Kensington. . 
 O'Hearn, D. J. (1990) Erin go bragh – Advance Australia Fair: a hundred years of growing, Celtic Club: Melbourne.

Clubs and societies in Victoria (Australia)
Culture of Melbourne
Organisations based in Melbourne
1887 establishments in Australia
Irish-Australian culture